Khaled Yahia (born 10 August 1991) is a retired Tunisian football midfielder.

References

1991 births
Living people
Tunisian footballers
Tunisia international footballers
Étoile Sportive du Sahel players
AS Marsa players
US Ben Guerdane players
Association football midfielders
Tunisian Ligue Professionnelle 1 players